Christian Lucien Vital (born March 21, 1997) is an American professional basketball player for the Salt Lake City Stars of the NBA G League. He played college basketball for the UConn Huskies.

Early life and high school career
Vital is the oldest of five children born to Rose Vital-Williams. He grew up playing basketball for the PSA Cardinals Amateur Athletic Union program. He played chess from age five, competing in various tournaments in New York City, and continued playing the game in high school. Vital began high school at the Rectory School in Pomfret, Connecticut, living away from his family. He played basketball for St. Thomas More School in Oakdale, Connecticut for his final two years of high school. In his final season, Vital averaged 16.8 points, seven rebounds, and 2.2 assists per game, leading his team to a 31–7 record and the National Prep Championship final. He earned New England Preparatory School Athletic Council Class AAA first team honors and was selected to play in the Jordan Brand Classic Regional Game. Vital originally committed to play college basketball for UNLV but re-opened his recruitment after head coach Dave Rice left the program. On April 29, 2016, he committed to UConn over an offer from Louisville, among others.

College career
Vital started 10 games as a freshman and averaged 9.1 points and 3.5 rebounds per game, though the Huskies finished with a 16–17 overall record, the program's first losing season in 30 years. On November 19, 2017, Vital scored a career-high 30 points in a 85–66 win over Boston University. As a sophomore, Vital averaged 14.9 points, a team-leading 5.4 rebounds and 1.6 steals per game. Following the season he declared for the 2018 NBA draft, but opted to return to UConn, citing "unfinished business." Vital averaged 14.9 points and 5.6 rebounds per game as a junior while leading the Huskies with 52 steals. As a senior, Vital averaged 16.4 points, 6.3 rebounds, 2.6 assists and 2.5 steals per game. He was named to the First Team All-American Athletic Conference. Vital scored 1,735 points in his UConn career, hitting an AAC-record 265 three-pointers.

Professional career

Rio Grande Valley Vipers (2021–2022)
On August 19, 2020, Vital signed his first professional contract with BG Göttingen of the Basketball Bundesliga. However, his contract was terminated on September 21. After going undrafted in the 2020 NBA draft, he signed with the Memphis Grizzlies, but waived on December 16. He later joined the Memphis Hustle of the NBA G League in January 2021, but did not compete in any games.

On October 16, 2021 Vital signed with the Houston Rockets but was waived shortly thereafter. He subsequently joined the Rio Grande Valley Vipers where he played 45 games and averaged 12.8 points, 3.4 rebounds, 3.0 assists, and shot .401 from three-point range while helping the Vipers win the G League Championship.

Hamilton Honey Badgers (2022)
On May 12, 2022, Vital signed with the Hamilton Honey Badgers of the CEBL. On August 14, he won the franchise's first CEBL title with the Honey Badgers. Vital was named the CEBL Final MVP after scoring 17 points in the 90-88 win over Scarborough. Over the season, Vital averaged a team leading 17.4 points and 4.8 rebounds in 15 games.

Raptors 905 (2022)
Vital joined the Toronto Raptors for the 2022 NBA Summer League. He did not make the final roster but was added to their G League affiliate, Raptors 905.

Salt Lake City Stars (2022–present)
On December 15, 2022, Vital was traded to the Salt Lake City Stars.

Career statistics

College

|-
| style="text-align:left;"| 2016–17
| style="text-align:left;"| UConn
| 31 || 10 || 28.5 || .391 || .366 || .708 || 3.5 || 1.8 || 1.1 || .2 || 9.1
|-
| style="text-align:left;"| 2017–18
| style="text-align:left;"| UConn
| 32 || 23 || 31.7 || .383 || .318 || .846 || 5.4 || 1.7 || 1.6 || .0 || 14.9
|-
| style="text-align:left;"| 2018–19
| style="text-align:left;"| UConn
| 33 || 29 || 30.2 || .453 || .409 || .813 || 5.6 || 2.4 || 1.6 || .0 || 14.2
|-
| style="text-align:left;"| 2019–20
| style="text-align:left;"| UConn
| 31 || 31 || 32.2 || .398 || .346 || .899 || 6.3 || 2.6 || 2.5 || .2 || 16.4
|- class="sortbottom"
| style="text-align:center;" colspan="2"| Career
| 127 || 93 || 30.6 || .407 || .358 || .836 || 5.2 || 2.1 || 1.7 || .1 || 13.7

References

External links
UConn Huskies bio

1997 births
Living people
American expatriate basketball people in Canada
American men's basketball players
Basketball players from New York City
Hamilton Honey Badgers players
Point guards
Raptors 905 players
Rio Grande Valley Vipers players
Salt Lake City Stars players
Sportspeople from Queens, New York
UConn Huskies men's basketball players
Vermont Academy alumni